Useless Lies is an upcoming South Korean television series directed by Nam Sung-woo, starring Kim So-hyun, Hwang Min-hyun, and Seo Ji-hoon. It is scheduled to premiere on tvN in 2023.

Synopsis
The series depicts the story of a woman who can't trust people because of her ability to hear lies and uncovers the truth while getting entangled with a murder suspect who no one believes in his innocence.

Cast

Main
 Kim So-hyun as Mok Sol-hee: a person who gave up her everyday happiness when she was young due to her ability to hear lies.
 Hwang Min-hyun as Kim Do-ha: a famous composer and producer in Korea who goes by the stage name "K", and his real name, age, place of birth, and marital status are all private.
 Seo Ji-hoon as Lee Kang-min: a detective who has been diagnosed with stomach cancer ahead of a proposal to Mok Sol-hee whom he fell in love at first sight.

Supporting
 Lee Si-woo as Sha On: a gorgeous born-to-be celebrity.

Production

Development
It is directed by Nam Sung-woo, who directed other works such as Kkondae Intern (2020) and My Roommate Is a Gumiho (2021).

Casting
On September 21, 2022, it was reported that Hwang Min-hyun and Kim So-hyun were in talks for the role of the male and female protagonists in the drama Useless Lies, and was later confirmed for the role in November.

Filming 
Filming began in February 2023.

References

External links
 
 

Korean-language television shows
2023 South Korean television series debuts

South Korean romance television series
South Korean mystery television series
Upcoming television series